Bigelow may refer to:

Surname 
 Bigelow (surname), a list of people

Places in the United States 
 Bigelow, Arkansas, a town
 Bigelow, Kansas, a town
 Bigelow, Minnesota, a city
 Bigelow, Missouri, a village
 Bigelow Neighborhood, a historic community in Olympia, Washington
 Mount Bigelow (Arizona)
 Mount Bigelow (Maine)
 Bigelow Peak, California

Business 
 Bigelow Aerospace
 Bigelow Commercial Space Station, a private space complex under development
 Bigelow Tea Company

Other uses 

 , a US Navy destroyer
 Bigelow Expandable Activity Module, a module attached to the International Space Station, developed by Bigelow Aerospace
 Bigelow School (disambiguation), two American schools on the National Register of Historic Places

See also

 
 
 Deuce Bigalow, protagonist of two films, Deuce Bigalow: Male Gigolo and Deuce Bigalow: European Gigolo